Journey Among Women is a 1977 Australian film directed by Tom Cowan.

Plot
In colonial Australia, refined Elizabeth Harrington, daughter of the judge advocate and engaged to Captain McEwan, decides to help female convicts who are living in appalling conditions. The women manage to escape and Elizabeth goes with them. An aboriginal girl, Kameragul, shows them how to survive in the bush but Elizabeth almost dies of malnutrition. A convict, Emily, nurses her back to health.

Months pass, and Emily is raped and killed by two men. Elizabeth leads the other convicts in a revenge attack against the men. Captain McEwan leads an attack on the women, in which he is killed. Elizabeth returns to her old life.

Cast
Jeune Pritchard as Elizabeth Harrington
Nell Campbell as Meg
Diana Fuller as Bess
Lisa Peers as Charlotte
Jude Kuring as Grace
Robyn Moase as Moira
Michelle Johnson as Bridget
Rose Lilley as Emily
Lillian Crombie as Kameragul
Therese Jack as Kate
Kay Self as Sheila
Helenka Link as Jane
Ralph Cotterill as Corporal Porteus
Martin Phelan as Captain Richard McEwan
Tim Elliot as Doctor Hargreaves

Production
The film was an original idea of Cowan's:
I was living in the bush, in Berowra Waters, and it was so powerful. I happened to read this French science-fiction story called Les Guerrieres about a future society of women - like an Amazon society - who were at war with the rest of society. Somehow in the combination of the wildness and strangeness and beauty of the bush and this story of wild women, I saw a parallel in how we perceived the bush and how the British first saw the bush as ugly. Well, we now see it as beautiful. And how the sort of excesses of radical feminism, when it began, were seen as ugly - ranting and raving and being abusive and so on. But, in fact, behind it were very beautiful things - not just the women, but the humanist ideas.
Cowan wrote the screenplay with producer John Wiley and playwright Dorothy Hewett. Funding came from private investment, the Australian Film Commission and a $25,000 grant from the Experimental Film Fund.

The film was shot over six weeks in 1976 near Berowra, north of Sydney, on 16mm. Shooting was a turbulent experience, in part because everyone was living together on location and there were fierce arguments between Cowan and the cast over the direction the film was taking.

Post-production took eighteen months and the film was blown up from 16mm to 35mm. Four minutes were taking out of the film after its premiere at the Cannes Film Festival.

Release
The film was a success at the box office, in part because of its nudity and lesbian scenes.

Tom Cowan won a special award for "creativity" at the 1977 AFI awards.

References

External links

Jane Mills, 'Death or Betrayal?', ACMI Essays - an essay on the film
Journey Among Women at Australian Screen Online
Journey Among Women at Oz Movies

1977 films
1977 drama films
Australian drama films
Films about Aboriginal Australians
Films set in colonial Australia
Films set in the 19th century
Films shot in 16 mm film
1970s English-language films